Aleksei Olegovich Gudkov (born 26 June 1972 in Smolensk) is a former Russian football player.

References

1972 births
Sportspeople from Smolensk
Living people
Soviet footballers
Russian footballers
Association football midfielders
Russian Premier League players
Russian expatriate footballers
Expatriate footballers in Belarus
FC Kristall Smolensk players
FC Anzhi Makhachkala players
FC Salyut Belgorod players
FC Slavia Mozyr players
FC Iskra Smolensk players